Truyolsodontos is an extinct genus of mackerel sharks that lived during the Late Cretaceous. It contains two valid species, T. estauni and T. magnus. It has been found in Spain, France, Ireland, and possibly Lithuania.

References

Lamniformes
Prehistoric cartilaginous fish genera